Richard Ralston Hough (1917 – July 9, 1992) was a Bell Labs engineer and AT&T executive.

Biography
Hough was born in Trenton, New Jersey, and attended Trenton High School.  He received his Bachelor of Science degree in 1939 and a graduate degree in 1940 in electrical engineering from Princeton University.  While at Princeton, he was on the school's swimming team and set several world records in that sport.

In 1980 Hough received the IEEE Alexander Graham Bell Medal for his role in the introduction of electronic telephone switching.

He was inaugurated into the International Swimming Hall of Fame in 1970.

He died in a crash in 1992, when the private plane he was piloting experienced engine failure near Concord, New Hampshire.

See also
 List of members of the International Swimming Hall of Fame

References

External links
 Hough's bio at IEEE History Center, written 1980
 Memorial Tribute to Hough, 1993, National Academy of Engineering

1917 births
1992 deaths
American electrical engineers
Scientists at Bell Labs
Princeton Tigers men's swimmers
Princeton University alumni
20th-century American engineers